This is a list of settlements in County Durham by population based on the results of the 2011 census. The next United Kingdom census will take place in 2021. In 2011, there were 26 built-up area subdivisions with 5,000 or more inhabitants in County Durham, shown in the table below. This list does not include areas transferred from County Durham to Tyne and Wear in 1974, including Gateshead and Sunderland, which would both be larger than the current largest settlement of Darlington.

Population ranking 

† - Parish count

See also 

List of settlements in Northumberland by population
List of settlements in Tyne and Wear by population
County Durham

References

External links 
 ONS Census website

County Durham
County Durham-related lists
County Durham